Mahanandi is a 2005 Indian Telugu-language action drama film, directed by V. Samudra, starring Sumanth, Anushka Shetty and Srihari in the Lead. The movie was released on 3 December 2005. It was a moderate success at the box office. It was dubbed into Hindi as Ek aur Mahayudh, and into Malayalam under the title Ullasam.

Plot
Swamy leaves Rayalaseema along with his sister during their childhood after their parents are murdered by a rival faction. Swamy later takes his revenge, and becomes a powerful don when he grows up. Bhaskar, the eventual leader of the rival faction group,  operates from Charlapally jail, and his main aim is to kill Swamy.

Shankar is an orphan raised by Swamy, and grows up to become the latter's body guard and right-hand man.   Without asking for her consent, Swamy settles his sister Nandini's marriage with the son of Naayar. Nandini doesn't like this proposal and plans to 
get out of it. She lies to Shankar, saying that she wants to marry the man she loves, Kumar. She seeks Shankar's help to escape from home.  Shankar, in a fix, reluctantly agrees. Before escaping, Nandini writes a letter to Swamy, saying that she is actually in love with Shankar, and that they are eloping. This letter creates a rift between Shankar and Swamy, who feels betrayed. Later, Nandini reveals to Shankar that she is actually in love with him, and not Kumar. Shankar is shocked.   Meanwhile, Bhaskar tries to take advantage of the rift between Swamy and Shankar and plans his attack. During their time together, Shankar too gradually falls in love with Nandini. Eventually, Swami and Shankar come together and fight Bhaskar. They finally reconcile, but Swami succumbs to his injuries.   Shankar and Nandini marry and eventually have a son, whom they name Swami.

Cast

 Sumanth as Shankar
 Anushka Shetty as Nandini
 Srihari as Swami
 Suman as Police Inspector
 Sai Kiran as Kumar
 Kota Srinivasa Rao as Nayar
  Prasanna Kumar
 Subbaraju
 Chittajalu Lakshmipati as Saidulu
 A. V. S. as lecturer
 L. B. Sriram as Shriram
 Venu Madhav as Anand
 Kovai Sarala as Chilakamma
 Kausalya as Swami's wife
 Seetha as Swami's mother
 Payal Rohatgi in item song Champakamaala
 Abhinayashree in item song Champakamaala 
 Alphonsa in item song Champakamaala

Soundtrack

The audio of Mahanandi was released by Venkatesh at a function arranged in Fortune Katriya Hotel. The guests included Srihari, Anushka, M. S. Raju, Kriishnamohan, Tammareddy Bharadwaja, M. L. Kumar Chowdary, Prabhas, B. Gopal, Sai Kiran, Ram Prasad, Boyapati Srinu etc. Venkatesh released the audio cassette and gave the first tape to Prabhas. Madhura Entertainments label distributed and marketed the audio. Sumanth could not attend the function as he was shooting for his other film, Godavari, near Rajahmundry.

References

External links

2005 films
2000s Telugu-language films
Indian action drama films
Indian romantic drama films
2000s action drama films
2005 romantic drama films
Indian romantic action films
Films directed by V. Samudra
2000s masala films
2000s romantic action films